Beyond Reason may refer to:

 Beyond Reason (1970 film), an Australian feature film
 Beyond Reason (TV series) (1977–80), a Canadian television quiz show
 Beyond Reason (1977 film), an American feature film
 Beyond Reason (1995 film), directed by Jim O'Brien
 Beyond Reason (book), a book by Margaret Trudeau

See also
 Love Beyond Reason, an album by Randy Stonehill